Dirt! The Movie is a 2009 American documentary film directed by filmmakers Gene Rosow and Bill Benenson and narrated by Jamie Lee Curtis. It was inspired by the book Dirt: The Ecstatic Skin of the Earth by William Bryant Logan. The documentary starred environmentalists like Wangari Maathai, Vandana Shiva, Gary Vaynerchuk, Paul Stamets and Bill Logan. The film explores the relationship between humans and soil, including its necessity for human life and impacts by society.

Dirt! The Movie was an official selection for the 2009 Sundance Film Festival  and won several awards, including the best documentary award at the 2009 Visions/Voices Environmental Film Festival and the "Best film for our future" award at the 2009 Mendocino Film Festival.

References

External links
 
 
 

2009 films
2009 documentary films
American documentary films
Documentary films about agriculture
Soil
Documentary films about environmental issues
Films based on non-fiction books
2000s English-language films
2000s American films